Hemicloeina is a genus of spiders in the family Trachycosmidae. It was first described in 1893 by Simon. , it contains 9 species found in Australia and only Hemicloeina bulolo found in New Guinea.

Species
Hemicloeina comprises the following species:
Hemicloeina bluff Platnick, 2002
Hemicloeina bulolo Platnick, 2002
Hemicloeina gayndah Platnick, 2002
Hemicloeina humptydoo Platnick, 2002
Hemicloeina julatten Platnick, 2002
Hemicloeina kapalga Platnick, 2002
Hemicloeina somersetensis (Thorell, 1881)
Hemicloeina spec Platnick, 2002
Hemicloeina wyndham Platnick, 2002

References

Trochanteriidae
Araneomorphae genera
Spiders of Australia
Spiders of Oceania